Spitz Stadium is a stadium in the Henderson Park of Lethbridge, Alberta, Canada.

It is used primarily for baseball. It is the home of the Lethbridge Bulls, a Western Canadian Baseball League team, and was the home of the Lethbridge Black Diamonds of the Pioneer League. The ballpark has a capacity of 3,000 people and was opened in 1975.

The City of Lethbridge renamed the stadium from Henderson Stadium in 2008, after it signed a 15-year agreement with Spitz, wherein Spitz received naming rights for that period and would provide $500,000 for renovation or upgrades until 2013.

References

External links
Official website

Sports venues in Lethbridge
Minor league baseball venues
Baseball venues in Alberta
1975 establishments in Alberta
Sports venues completed in 1975